Eagle was a passenger steamboat built in 1900 which served on Puget Sound until it was destroyed by fire.

Design and construction
Eagle was a smaller type of steamboat called a "steam launch". The wooden vessel was built at Eagle Harbor, Washington to run on routes connecting Seattle and Bainbridge Island, Washington. The overall size of the vessel was 40 gross tons and 23 registered tons. The vessel's US steamboat registration number was 136812.

Career
Eagle was destroyed by fire in 1902 at Eagle Harbor.  The vessel was replaced in service by the Florence K.

Notes

References 
 Newell, Gordon R., ed., H.W. McCurdy Marine History of the Pacific Northwest,  Superior Publishing Co., Seattle, WA (1966)
 U.S. Dept. of the Treasury, Bureau of Statistics, Annual List of Merchant Vessels of the United States (for year ending June 30, 1901)

1900 ships
Steamboats of Washington (state)
Propeller-driven steamboats of Washington (state)
Ships built in Bainbridge Island, Washington
History of Kitsap County, Washington
Transportation in Kitsap County, Washington
Bainbridge Island, Washington